Mission Mummy, is a 2016 Indian children and family drama film, written and directed by Ashish Kakkad and produced by Nigam Shah, Divyesh Mehta & Sugam Shah. It stars Aarti Patel, Raj Vazir, Satyam Sharma, Aashna Mehta & Saumya Shah in lead roles. This is the second film by Ashish Kakkad, after Better Half. Mission Mummy is produced under the banner of Virtual Entertainment. It is also co-produced by Ashish Kakkad. The story of the film is based on a book by Dhiruben Patel. The screenplay and dialogues are written by Dipak Soliya and Ashish Kakkad. The film celebrates the idea of "being Gujarati" and hence poet and lyricist Tushar Shukla was approached for a song portraying the love for the mother tongue.

Plot

Aparna (Aarti Patel), a working woman, quits her job to become a full-time mother. She raises her three kids Vyom (Satyam Sharma), Saloni (Aashna Mehta) and Vismay (Saumya Shah), with much love and care, and now that the kids are grownups, she is wondering if she should resume her career. Over the years, she has devoted her time and sacrificed her career for her children. But the kids now find her "old fashioned" and start to visualize a new image of her on their own. They demand their mother to be a modern and trendy lady. When Aparna wants to resume her career, the kids gradually intensify their demand to make mummy a modern woman. Their definition of modern is simple: everything has to be "western" and not "Gujarati". Aparna tries to pacify them but peer pressure makes the kids more resolute in their demand for a modern mummy. They call it "mission mummy". The mission is then implemented and everything changes in that family, forever.

The film beautifully touches on the important issue that in "happy families" of Gujarati community, there is a "set trend" of growing gap between mother and kids. It is not just a schism between the generations, it is a gap between the culture within the house and the culture outside. The strength of this film is that it presents a serious issue in a light-hearted and vibrant manner.

Cast

 Aarti Patel, Aparna (Mummy)
 Raj Vazir, Shrikant (Papa), Aparna"s husband
 Satyam, Vyom, eldest son
 Aashna, Saloni, daughter
 Saumya, Vismay, younger son
 Megha Bhojak
 Rohan Mistry
 Ved Choksi
 Himja Bhojak
 Viswa Dalal
 Sakshi Simran
 Hardav Shah
 Maharshi Shah
 Bhagyesh Thakkar
 Deep Joshi
 Khushi Joshi

Music

Music and background score is composed by Nishith Mehta, with lyrics penned by Narsinh Mehta, Dhiruben Patel, Tushar Shukla and Ashish Kakkad. The music album consists of four "Prabhatiyas" that were written by Narsinh Mehta.

Film"s title track, "Aa Chhe Mission Mummy" is penned by Ashish Kakkad. Another song, "Bhasha Mari Gujarati Chhe" is written by Tushar Shukla. The youngest actor Saumya wrote a song, "Jig Jig Jig Jignesh Bhai" during the shoot of the film, and when the director found it interesting he decided to take it in into the film. Original story writer Dhiruben Patel wrote a song, "Why Do I Have to Miss Her So Much?" for the film that is entirely written in English.

Official music album was released on 12 November 2016 in Ahmedabad, Gujarat. The music is digitally available through Hungama Digital.

Marketing
The film producers started the marketing and promotional campaigns from 13 October 2016. The producers of the film declared the title and release date on their official social media platforms.

Release
Preview screenings for a selected audience were conducted a few days before the actual release. The film was released in Gujarat, Mumbai, and Pune on 9 December 2016.

References

External links
 

2016 films
2010s Gujarati-language films